Mihai Fotino (14 September 1930 – 13 January 2014) was a prolific Romanian actor who has appeared in theatre, film, television, and radio, in a career spanning 70 years.

Born in Bucharest, he spent his early years in Brașov, where his father, Mișu Fotino, was a stage actor and director, and later graduated from Matei Basarab High School in Bucharest. 

Fotino made his debut at the age of 6, in 1936, in the play Colonial. He was noticed by the director , who brought him to Bucharest. Starting in 1956, he played for over 50 years at the National Theatre Bucharest.

Filmography

References

External links

1930 births
2014 deaths
Romanian male film actors
20th-century Romanian male actors
21st-century Romanian male actors
Male actors from Bucharest
Recipients of the Order of Cultural Merit (Romania)
Burials at Bellu Cemetery